Sjoerd Gerardus Antonius van Griensven (born 20 June 1991) is a footballer who plays as a defender and goalkeeper for Funmakers. Born in the Netherlands. he is a Sint Maarten international.

Career

Van Griensven started his career with Dutch tenth tier side . In 2016, he signed for Funmakers in Sint Maarten.

References

External links

 

1991 births
Association football defenders
Association football goalkeepers
Dutch expatriate footballers
Dutch footballers
Living people
Sint Maarten footballers
Sint Maarten international footballers